Abu Loza's Bath is a historic Turkish bath in Saudi Arabia. The bath utilizes sulfur mineral water spring. It is located in the village of the Qatif Governorate.

History
Although the exact origin of the establishment is unknown, it is considered that it dates back to the 3rd century AH (10-11th century CE). Major renovation was conducted during the Ottoman era and the Nejd era. The hamam takes the name from the water spring Ain Abu Loza, where people utilized the water to cure skin diseases and knuckle pains. The water spring was dug by the Canaanites. Majority of the customers who used the bath were pearl hunters and the people living in the Qatif Castle, who were mostly traders. Today, although the hamam is under the supervision of the Ministry of Antiquity, it faces the danger of deterioration and depletion of water, which has been a concern for the first time in the history of the bath.

References

11th-century establishments in Asia
Archaeological sites in Saudi Arabia
Ottoman baths
Tourist attractions in Saudi Arabia
Public baths in the Arab world